Rutuja Bhosale and Hiroko Kuwata were the defending champions, but chose not to participate.

Destanee Aiava and Lizette Cabrera won the title, defeating Alison Bai and Jaimee Fourlis in the final, 6–4, 2–6, [10–3].

Seeds

Draw

Draw

References
Main Draw

Darwin Tennis International - Doubles
Darwin Tennis International